Bence Tordai (born 26 January 1981) is a Hungarian politician, economist and sociologist. A founding member of Dialogue for Hungary, he has served as Member of the National Assembly since 2018. He has been co-leader of the Dialogue for Hungary since July 2022.

Early life and career
Born in Budapest in 1981, Tordai graduated from the Berzsenyi Dániel High School in 1999. He received his degree in economics from the Corvinus University of Budapest in 2005, where he was also a member of the College for Advanced Studies in Social Theory for 7 years. After graduation, Tordai worked as a statistician for the Hungarian Central Statistical Office. Between 2008 and 2015, he was a teacher at the Budapest Metropolitan University.

Political career
In 2009, Tordai was a founding member of the Politics Can Be Different political movement. He was the party's spokesperson from 2010 to 2011.

In 2013, Tordai left LMP and became a member of the presidium of the newly formed Dialogue for Hungary, where he served as spokesperson between 2015 and 2018. In 2018, Tordai was elected Member of Parliament from the joint list of the MSZP–PM political alliance. He was deputy group leader of Dialogue during the 2018–2022 parliamentary cycle. He was a member of the Committee on Enterprise Development. Tordai also served as one of the recorders of the National Assembly from May 2018 to May 2022.

Several demonstrative actions can be linked to his name. After placing inscriptions on the door of Prime Minister Viktor Orbán's office in 2017, László Kövér, the Speaker of the National Assembly, banned him from the Parliament "eternally". After his election as MP – which thus overturned Kövér's punishment – Tordai omitted the formality in his inaugural speech to Prime Minister Viktor Orbán, then referred to him as "so-called" prime minister. Speaker László Kövér fined Tordai more than 8.2 million HUF in March 2021 for violating the house rules. Tordai asked Minister of Finance Mihály Varga to join a budget amendment motion while trying to record with his smartphone camera how Varga would react to the government's withdrawal of HUF 9.3 billion from the medical offices in the 2nd and 3rd district of Budapest. According to Varga, this provoked him and hindered him in his work.

Tordai defeated Olga Kálmán (DK) in the 2nd district of Budapest (Budapest 4th constituency) during the 2021 opposition primary, becoming candidate of the joint opposition alliance United for Hungary for the 2022 parliamentary election. Subsequently, Tordai defeated Fidesz candidate Csaba Gór, obtaining the parliamentary seat. Tordai was elected leader of the parliamentary group of Dialogue in May 2022, replacing Tímea Szabó. He also became a member of the parliament's Economic Committee. Tordai was elected co-leader of the party, alongside Rebeka Szabó in July 2022.

References

External links
 
 His profile at the National Assembly

1981 births
Living people
People from Budapest
Corvinus University of Budapest alumni
Hungarian economists
Hungarian politicians
Dialogue for Hungary politicians
LMP – Hungary's Green Party politicians
Members of the National Assembly of Hungary (2018–2022)
Members of the National Assembly of Hungary (2022–2026)